Bi Nahr or Binahr may refer to:
Bi Nahr-e Olya
Bi Nahr-e Sofla